Longueuil is a city in the province of Quebec, Canada.

Longueuil may also refer to:

Longueuil, Quebec
 Le Vieux-Longueuil, a borough in the city
 Old Longueuil, a neighborhood in Le Vieux-Longueuil borough
 Longueuil (electoral district), former name of the federal electoral district Longueuil—Saint-Hubert
 Urban agglomeration of Longueuil, an urban agglomeration regrouping Longueuil and its seceded municipalities 
 Longueuil station, a subway station
 Place Longueuil, a shopping mall

Other uses
 Baron de Longueuil, a French colonial title

See also
 Longueil (disambiguation)